This is a list of international games played by the Germany national team between 2000 and 2019.

2000s

2000

2001

2002

2003

2004

2005

2006

2007

2008

2009

2010s

2010

2011

2012

2013

2014

2015

2016

2017

2018

2019

Cancelled matches 
Below is a list of all matches in the period that were cancelled. Matches that were rescheduled to another date are not included.

See also 
 East Germany national football team results (1952–74)
 Germany national football team all-time record
 Germany national football team results (1908–42)
 Germany national football team results (1990–99)
 Germany national football team results (2020–present)
 West Germany national football team results (1950–90)

References

External links
 German Football Federation website
Germany - International Results - Details 2000-2009 at RSSSF
Germany - International Results - Details 2010-2019 at RSSSF

Germany national football team results